Brazilian cruzeiro refers to any of four distinct Brazilian currencies: 

 Brazilian cruzeiro (1942–1967), worth 1,000 Brazilian réis
 Brazilian cruzeiro (1967–1986), denominated cruzeiro novo between 1967 and 1970 in the transition from the previous standard banknotes to the new banknotes issued by Casa da Moeda do Brasil to avoid confusion between the old and the new currency.
 Brazilian cruzeiro (1990–1993), redenomination of cruzado novo stemming from the Plano Collor.
 Brazilian cruzeiro real (1993–1994), currency with a view to facilitating accounting transactions in the transition between cruzeiro and Real, necessary due to the difficulties of accounting values at the time due to inflation.

See also

 Brazilian cruzado (1986–1989)
 Brazilian cruzado novo (1989–1990)
 O Cruzeiro (Brazilian weekly, 1928–1975)

cruzeiro
1942 establishments in Brazil
1986 disestablishments in Brazil
1990 establishments in Brazil
1993 disestablishments in Brazil
20th century in Brazil
Currency symbols